Evgeni Arkadievich Platov (Ukrainian to English: Ev'heni Arkadievich Platov) (born August 7, 1967; Ukrainian: Євген Аркадійович Платов) is a Russian former competitive ice dancer. He is best known for his partnership with Oksana Grishuk from 1989 to 1998. With Grishuk, he is a two-time Olympic champion (1994, 1998), four-time World champion (1994–1997), and three-time European champion (1996–1998).

With previous partner Elena Krykanova, he was a three-time World Junior champion (1984–1986). During his career, he represented the Soviet Union, the Unified Team, and Russia. Since retiring from competition, he works as a figure skating coach and choreographer.

Personal life 
Platov was born on August 7, 1967, in Odessa, Ukrainian SSR, Soviet Union. He lived in Odessa until his move to Moscow, Russian SFSR, in 1982. He married Maria Anikanova, a Russian figure skater and later actress, but they eventually divorced.

Platov settled in New Jersey in 1998.

Platov coaches at Palm Beach Ice Works, West Palm Beach, Florida.

Early career 
Platov switched from singles to ice dancing in October 1976. Boris Rublev arranged his first partnership and then paired him with Elena Krykanova a couple of months later. The two were coached by Rublev in Odessa until 1982 when they moved to Moscow to train under Natalia Dubova. Krykanova/Platov won three World Junior titles from 1984 to 1986.

Platov began competing on the senior level with Larisa Fedorinova in 1987. In 1988, they won gold at the Karl Schäfer Memorial and silver at the Prize of Moscow News. Their partnership ended in August 1989.

Partnership with Grishuk 
Dubova paired Platov with Oksana Grishuk in September 1989. They trained in Moscow. Three months later, in December 1989, they won the bronze medal at the Soviet Championships. They were fifth in their World Championship debut in 1990. Their first European and World medals, both bronze, came at the 1992 European Championships and 1992 World Championships.

In mid-1992, due to tensions between Grishuk and Maya Usova and their alleged love rivalry over Maya's then-husband and partner Alexander Zhulin,  Dubova allegedly expelled Grishuk from her group or Grishuk chose to leave. Dubova found a new partner for Platov (the then teenage future Olympic champion Tatiana Navka) while Grishuk briefly searched for a new partner in Germany before returning to Moscow and her previous coach, Natalia Linichuk. Platov decided not to follow Dubova and re-teamed with Grishuk in the fall of 1992.

During the 1992–93 season, Grishuk/Platov won European and World silver medals. In 1993–94, they won silver at the European Championships. They won their first Olympic title at the 1994 Olympics. They ended the season with their first World title at the 1994 World Championships. They then left Russia and moved with Linichuk to Newark, Delaware for better training and living conditions.

Grishuk/Platov missed most of 1994–95 due to injury but returned to win the 1995 World Championships. They had a full season in 1995–96 and won another set of European and World titles.

In 1996, Grishuk/Platov split from Linichuk and moved to Tatiana Tarasova in Marlborough, Massachusetts. Injury kept them out of competition in the first half of the 1996–97 season but they returned to win their second European and fourth World title. In September 1997, she changed her first name to Pasha after being repeatedly confused with Oksana Baiul, but later went back to Oksana. In 1997–98, Grishuk/Platov won their third European Championships. At the event, they were slashed in a practice collision with Anjelika Krylova / Oleg Ovsiannikov but were not seriously hurt and both teams said it was an accident. Grishuk/Platov competed at their third Olympics in 1998 in Nagano, where they became the first ice dancers to repeat as gold medalists.

Grishuk/Platov won 20 consecutive competitions from 1994 to 1998. They were entered in the Guinness Book of World Records in 1998 for becoming the first team in the history of ice dancing to win Olympic gold twice. Grishuk and Platov combined speed and difficult elements, and displayed their mastery of numerous styles of dance. On their partnership, Platov said in 1998: "It's like being a husband and a wife. Sometimes, you fight. Sometimes, you walk away and calm down. I met her a long time ago, and I still remember her as a little girl on the ice. She was so little. So active. Usually, little girls are boring. But that girl. Oh, there was a fire on ice." He also said: "It's hard to change her mind. She fights every step. But it works out. That's why she is so good."

Grishuk/Platov retired from competition and did not compete at the 1998 World Championships. They skated together in shows until the summer of 1998. Platov then decided to skate with their former rival Maya Usova and Grishuk teamed up with Alexander Zhulin.

Grishuk/Platov skated together at a Russian ice show in 2006. They also skated together in February 2008 in Nagano, Japan for their ten-year anniversary of winning the 1998 Olympic gold medal.

Coaching career 
Platov was an assistant coach to his own former coach Tatiana Tarasova from 2002–2004, along with Maya Usova, at the International Skating Center of Connecticut in Simsbury, Connecticut. He helped coach Olympic Champion Shizuka Arakawa to her only world title in 2004 and briefly worked with Sasha Cohen and Johnny Weir under the guidance of Tarasova.

In the fall of 2005, Platov moved to New Jersey and became the assistant coach to his former rival, Alexander Zhulin, helping to coach the ice dancing team of Tatiana Navka and Roman Kostomarov to European and Olympic gold medals. He started coaching on his own when Zhulin left New Jersey to go back to Russia. His current and former students include:
 Galit Chait / Sergei Sakhnovski
 Penny Coomes / Nicholas Buckland
 Sinead Kerr / John Kerr
 Alexandra Zaretsky / Roman Zaretsky
 Allison Reed / Otar Japaridze
 Olivia Smart / Joseph Buckland

Platov formerly coached at the Princeton Sports Center in Monmouth Junction, New Jersey. In mid-2009, he began coaching at the Igloo ice rink in Mount Laurel, New Jersey.

In 2017, Platov worked alongside award-winning ice director Tony Mercer, to coach the world-famous Imperial Ice Stars for Cinderella on Ice.

Programs

With Grishuk

With Usova

Results 
GP: Champions Series (Grand Prix)

With Grishuk

With Fedorinova

With Krykanova

References

External links 

Russian male ice dancers
Olympic figure skaters of Russia
Olympic figure skaters of the Unified Team
Figure skaters at the 1992 Winter Olympics
Figure skaters at the 1994 Winter Olympics
Figure skaters at the 1998 Winter Olympics
Russian figure skating coaches
Soviet male ice dancers
Olympic gold medalists for Russia
Sportspeople from Odesa
1967 births
Living people
Olympic medalists in figure skating
World Figure Skating Championships medalists
European Figure Skating Championships medalists
World Junior Figure Skating Championships medalists
Medalists at the 1998 Winter Olympics
Medalists at the 1994 Winter Olympics
Competitors at the 1990 Goodwill Games